Muhammad Hashim Gazdar  (1 February 1893 – 19 February 1968) was one of the three representatives from Sindh to the Constituent Assembly of Pakistan, and the second Deputy Speaker of the National Assembly of Pakistan.

Early life

Gazdar was born in 1895 in Jaisalmer. He was a converted Muslim as his ancestral roots are linked to Rajput Clans of Rajasthan (present-day India). His father, Faiz Muhammad Gadha, was an engineer who had moved from Rajistan to Karachi after the Sindh was under the jurisdiction of the British empire since 1843.

Gazdar started his academic career from Sindh Madressah-tul-Islam, Karachi, and completed Intermediate in 1911. He also studied civil engineering, earning a degree from the College of Engineering, Pune in 1916.

He was involved in an uplift project for the lower caste in Bombay, but this was unsuccessful. He and a number of other people were dismissed from this project.

Political life
After losing his job in Bombay he returned to Karachi where he performed his services as an engineer, in District Local Board, Karachi. However, during the subsequent four years, differences on policy matters arose with G.M. Syed, who was then the president of Board; Gazdar resigned.

Later, he joined politics. He was elected a member of the Bombay Legislative Council from Sindh constituency in 1934 election. During his subsequent political career, he was also elected the Mayor of Karachi for the term from May, 1941 to May, 1942.

During his tenure as a member of the Sindh Assembly, he also joined the Ittehad party for some time. He joined All India Muslim League, which was launching a movement for creation of a separate state for Muslim population of India within the sub-continent (which emerged as Pakistan later) under the leadership of Quaid-e-Azam Muhammad Ali Jinnah. Being one; the most confident for Quaid-e-Azam, he was again elected a member of Legislative Assembly from Sindh; and appointed as the Deputy Speaker of the then Sindh Assembly.

Gazdar was among the legislating members who represented Sindh in the first session of Pakistan's first Constituent Assembly, and convened for the purpose of legislation in Sindh Assembly Building, Karachi on 10 August 1947, four days before Pakistan's independence and formation was imminent. Other members included Pirzada Abdul Sattar Abdul Rehman, Muhammed Ayub Khoro, and J. Ram das Doulat Ram.

Gazdar's role as a former Pakistani politician is highly acknowledged. Being an honest legislator, a steadfast Muslim League politician, his role was significant with a view to turning the stream of politics to a new era.

He died in 1968.

See also 

 List of mayors of Karachi

References

Sindhi people
Mayors of Karachi
1890s births
1966 deaths
Savitribai Phule Pune University alumni
Politicians from Karachi
Pakistani people of Rajasthani descent
Pakistani civil engineers
Deputy Speakers of the National Assembly of Pakistan
Members of the Constituent Assembly of Pakistan